Andriy Vyacheslavovych Nesterov (born 2 July 1990) is a Ukrainian professional football defender who plays for Polissya Zhytomyr.

Career

Early years
Nesterov is a product of Krystal Kherson and Metalurh Zaporizhzhia academies.

Metalurh Zaporizhzhia
He made his debut for Metalurh Zaporizhzhia coming in as a second-half substitute against Metalist Kharkiv on 26 April 2009 in the Ukrainian Premier League.

External links
 
 

1990 births
Living people
Footballers from Zaporizhzhia
Ukrainian footballers
Association football defenders
FC Metalurh Zaporizhzhia players
FC Metalurh-2 Zaporizhzhia players
CSF Bălți players
FC Karpaty Lviv players
Mezőkövesdi SE footballers
FC Polissya Zhytomyr players
Ukrainian Premier League players
Ukrainian First League players
Ukrainian Second League players
Nemzeti Bajnokság I players
Moldovan Super Liga players
Ukrainian expatriate footballers
Expatriate footballers in Moldova
Expatriate footballers in Hungary
Ukrainian expatriate sportspeople in Moldova
Ukrainian expatriate sportspeople in Hungary